Haroon Ahmed FREng (born 2 March 1936), is a British Pakistani scientist in specialising the fields of microelectronics and electrical engineering. He is Emeritus Professor of Microelectronics at the Cavendish Laboratory, the Physics Department of the University of Cambridge, Honorary Fellow of Corpus Christi College, Cambridge, and Fellow of the Royal Academy of Engineering.

Education 
Ahmed was educated at St Patrick's High School, Karachi, followed by an undergraduate degree at Imperial College London. He went on to obtain his PhD in 1963 and his Doctor of Science degrees in 1996 from the University of Cambridge.

Career
Ahmed was appointed a faculty member of the Engineering Department, Cambridge in 1963 and worked there for 20 years before moving to the Physics Department where he was promoted to Professor of Microelectronics and was the Head of the Microelectronics Research Centre until his retirement in 2003.  He is a former Master of Corpus Christi College, Cambridge, and is now an Honorary Fellow. He is Fellow of the Institute of Physics, and Fellow of the Institution of Electrical Engineers.

Research 
Ahmed has published a large number of papers in scientific and engineering research journals on microelectronics, micro and nanofabrication, electron and ion beam lithography, semiconductor single electron devices and related topics.

He established a number of major collaborations between industry and the University including the Hitachi Cambridge Laboratory in the Microelectronics Research Centre.  He is the author with P.J. Spreadbury of Electronics for Engineers (CUP 1973) and An Introduction to Physical Electronics with A.H.W. Beck (Elsevier, 1968, out of print).  He was elected a Fellow of the Royal Academy of Engineering in 1990.

He has served as a Syndic of Cambridge University Press, as Non-Executive Director of the Addenbrooke's Hospital NHS Trust, as President of the Philosophical Society, as a member of the MacRobert  Committee which awards a prize annually to the most innovative engineering company in the UK  and is currently a member of the Development Board of Imperial College.  He has also worked as a consultant to several major electronics industrial companies.
He was elected a Fellow of Corpus Christi College in 1967, became Warden of Leckhampton House (the College's Graduate Campus) in 1993 and Master in 2000, succeeding Professor Sir Tony Wrigley and resigned in 2006 to advise the Government of Pakistan on Higher Education matters.

He was the College's 48th Master since its foundation in 1352.  In his time as Master the College celebrated its 650th anniversary, the Taylor Library project was implemented, the Conservation Centre for manuscripts was built and the project on the digital imaging of the College's  Parker collection was started.

Personal life
Among his other interests are golf and cricket.

References

 
 

1936 births
Living people
British agnostics
Alumni of Imperial College London
Fellows of Corpus Christi College, Cambridge
Fellows of the Royal Academy of Engineering
Pakistani scientists
Pakistani emigrants to the United Kingdom
Members of the University of Cambridge Computer Laboratory
British scientists
Pakistani electrical engineers
Masters of Corpus Christi College, Cambridge
Alumni of King's College, Cambridge
British academics of Pakistani descent